The Detroit Electric SP.01 is a proposed battery electric vehicle designed by the Detroit Electric company and originally unveiled to the media in Detroit and then publicly at the Shanghai Motor Show in 2013 and formally launched in the UK in 2017 as a production ready model, but never progressed beyond prototype stage. It is powered by an air-cooled lithium polymer battery. Its maximum speed and acceleration are comparable to those of the Tesla Roadster.

History 
The original Detroit Electric was an electric car model produced by the Anderson Electric Car Company in Detroit, Michigan, from 1907 to 1939. 

The marque was revived in 2008 by Albert Lam, former Group CEO of the Lotus Engineering Group and executive director of Lotus Cars of England. to produce modern all-electric cars by Detroit Electric Holding Ltd. of the Netherlands.

Detroit Electric was relaunched to the world on 19 March 2013, with a press launch of its proposed new U.S. office in the Fisher Building in Detroit, Michigan but the office deal was never concluded.  

In 2014 it emerged that a change of strategy relocated the proposed manufacturing if the SP01 to the UK and testing of the prototypes continued in 2014. 

The SP.01 was relaunched again in 2017 following new investment from Far East Smarter Energy with $370 million for the European arm to homologate the car and prepare production in Leamington Spa. 

The company ceased to make any further announcements after September 2017

Detroit Electric SP.01

Production was delayed because, the company had not been able to secure an agreement for a manufacturing facility. The SP.01, like the Tesla Roadster, will be built on a Lotus Elise aluminum chassis with carbon fiber body, and production will be limited to 999 units. The SP.01 prototypes are being assembled in Europe. The commercial version was to have been built at a factory in Wayne County, Michigan, but Detroit Electric announced it would initially be built in the Netherlands. In June 2014 Detroit Electric announced that the SP.01 would be built in Royal Leamington Spa, England, with their Netherlands facility handling the sales and marketing side of the operation.

The electric motor drives the rear wheels via a four-speed manual transmission, and a fifth and sixth gear ratios in the gearbox are redundant and available as an option. The electric car will have a 37 kWh lithium-polymer battery pack capable of delivering a range of  under the New European Driving Cycle (NEDC) standard. A 7.7 kWh home charging unit will fully charge the car in 4.3 hours, a charging through a standard 13A power source will take 8 hours.

The first production unit was exported to China in February 2016 to be used as a demonstrator. Volume production was planned to begin at the Leamington works later in 2017, as the first of a series of Detroit Electric models.

Technology

Unique to the SP.01 is its thermal management system, developed in-house by Detroit Electric.  As opposed to liquid coolant, Detroit Electric has opted for conditioned air to cool and heat the battery pack as this not only lengthens the battery life, but also makes the entire drive system lighter and safer in the event of a crash.  The SP.01 has a telemetry-link to the company's central portal for continuous monitoring of battery and powertrain condition.

An Android application, the Smartphone Application Managed Infotainment(‘SAMI’), will provide access to all auxiliary functions ranging from music player, satellite navigation, regenerative braking adjustment and access to vehicle systems status, level of battery charge, range to recharge and other vehicle telemetry.  Via GSM, SAMI will also be able to detect the vehicle location.

The SP.01 has bi-directional charging technology ('360 Powerback’) which can detect loss of inflow current and reverse feed to the home circuit.  Charging other electric vehicles is also made possible with 360 Powerback (i.e. vehicle to vehicle).

See also
List of modern production plug-in electric vehicles
History of the electric vehicle

References

External links 
 Detroit Electric web site

Vehicles introduced in 2013
Electric sports cars
Lotus Cars